Deconica coprophila, commonly known as the dung-loving psilocybe, or dung demon, is a species of mushroom in the family Strophariaceae.  First described as Agaricus coprophilus by Jean Baptiste François Pierre Bulliard in 1793, it was transferred to the genus Psilocybe by Paul Kummer in 1871. In the first decade of the 2000s, several molecular studies showed that the Psilocybe was polyphyletic, and the non-bluing (non-hallucinogenic) species were transferred to Deconica.

It can grow on cattle dung.

While non-toxic, the species is not a good edible mushroom.

References

External links

Strophariaceae
Fungi described in 1793
Fungi of Europe
Fungi of North America
Inedible fungi